Rusty Ryan may refer to:

 Rusty Ryan (character), a character from the Ocean's film series
 Rusty Ryan (actor) (1947–2003), Canadian actor and drag queen